Johnny Stewart (1872- unknown) was an English association footballer who played as a half back.

Born in Newcastle-upon-Tyne, Stewart began his footballing career with Old St Luke's. When the club was amalgamated into Old Castle Swifts he continued to play for them until their demise in 1895. A boilermaker by trade, Stewart worked for Thames Ironworks and Shipbuilding Company and played for their works team, Thames Ironworks upon their creation in 1895. One of his first appearances was against a more experienced Chatham side in the FA Cup, which Chatham won 5–0. He did play all the games in the 1895-96 West Ham Charity Cup, including three games against Barking, gaining a winner's medal. His last game for the club was against Leyton in an Essex Senior Cup tie in 1896.

References

Footballers from Newcastle upon Tyne
English footballers
Association football midfielders
Thames Ironworks F.C. players
1872 births
Date of death unknown
Old Castle Swifts F.C. players